Paderborn (Westphalian: Patterbuorn, also Paterboärn) is a city in eastern North Rhine-Westphalia, Germany, capital of the Paderborn district. The name of the city derives from the river Pader and Born, an old German term for the source of a river. The river Pader originates in more than 200 springs near Paderborn Cathedral, where St. Liborius is buried.

Paderborn ranks 55th on the List of cities in Germany by population.

History
Paderborn was founded as a bishopric by Charlemagne in 795, although its official history began in 777 when Charlemagne built a castle near the Paderborn springs. In 799 Pope Leo III fled his enemies in Rome and reached Paderborn, where he met Charlemagne, and stayed there for three months. It was during this time that it was decided that Charlemagne would be crowned emperor. Charlemagne reinstated Leo in Rome in 800 and was crowned as Holy Roman Emperor by Leo in return. In 836, St. Liborius became the patron saint of Paderborn after his bones were moved there from Le Mans by Bishop Badurad. St. Liborius is commemorated in Paderborn every year in July with the Liborifest. The bishop of Paderborn, Meinwerk, became a Prince of the Empire in 1100. The bishop had several large buildings built, and the area became a place for the emperors to stay. 

The city was taken by Prussia in 1802, then by the French vassal state Kingdom of Westphalia from 1807 to 1813 and then returned to Prussia.

Native Friedrich Sertürner, a pharmacist's apprentice in Paderborn, was the first to isolate morphine from opium in 1804.

In 1914 the Paderborn military camp was turned into a prisoner of war camp named Sennelager.

In 1930, the See of Paderborn was promoted to archdiocese.

During World War II, Paderborn was bombed by Allied aircraft in 1944 and 1945, resulting in 85% destruction, including many of the historic buildings. It was seized by the US 3rd Armored Division after a pitched battle 31 March - 1 April 1945, in which tanks and flamethrowers were used during combined mechanized-infantry assaults against the city's southwestern, southern and southeastern approaches.

After the city was reconstructed in the 1940s and 1950s, Paderborn became a major industrial seat in Westphalia. The British Army retained a significant presence in the area until 2020, when British units were relocated back to the United Kingdom. Only a small training and enabling staff remain at Paderborn to facilitate temporary deployments to use the Sennelager Training Area.

On May 20, 2022, Paderborn was hit by a damaging tornado, leaving 38 injured & considerable damage along its path.

Geography

The hills of the Eggegebirge are located east of the city.

Neighbouring municipalities

 Altenbeken
 Bad Lippspringe
 Borchen
 Delbrück
 Hövelhof
 Lichtenau
 Salzkotten

Subdivisions
The city of Paderborn consists of the following Stadtteile (city sections):

 Paderborn (city center)
 Benhausen
 Dahl
 Elsen
 Marienloh
 Neuenbeken
 Sande
 Sennelager
 Schloß Neuhaus
 Wewer

Demographics
Paderborn has a population of over 144,000, of which approximately 10% are students at the local university (Paderborn University). Additionally, about 10,000 members or relatives of members of the British armed forces live within Westfalen Garrison, but are not included in the nominal population size.

60% of the population are Catholics, 20% Lutherans and 20% members of other faiths or not religious.

Economy
Paderborn is the headquarters of the former Nixdorf Computer AG, which was acquired by Siemens in the early 1990s and known as Siemens-Nixdorf for about ten years. The company is now known as Diebold Nixdorf, which is still located in Paderborn, but Siemens retains a considerable presence in the city.

Many other information technology
companies as well as industrial enterprises are located in Paderborn, too:
 Benteler AG (steel/tube, automotive, trade)
 Claas (farm machines)
 Deutsche Bahn AG (vehicle maintenance)
 dSPACE GmbH (engineering tools)
 Flextronics
 Fujitsu Technology Solutions
 Orga Systems GmbH
 Secure Computing Corporation
 Siemens AG (Siemens IT Solutions and Services)
 Zuken (PCB EMC Analysis and Design Software)
Paderborn is also home of the "Paderborner" brewery, which has belonged to the Warsteiner group since 1990.

Arts and culture
Paderborn has the largest computer museum in the world, the Heinz Nixdorf MuseumsForum, opened in 1996.

The town supports the Nordwestdeutsche Philharmonie for regular symphony concerts in the Paderhalle.

The city is known today for its exhibitions in three museums: the Kaiserpfalz, The Diocesan Museum and the Art Museum - Städtische Galerie. The city also have some natural tourist attractions within and around.

Image gallery

Politics
With the Archdiocese of Paderborn based in the city cathedral, Paderborn has traditionally been a conservative Catholic city. In the Bundestag, it's located in the eponymous electoral district, which is a safe seat for CDU. Only twice (1949 and 2021) has CDU not received a majority of the district's votes, and from 1953 to 1987 always received at least 60% of the district's vote. In the Landtag of North Rhine-Westphalia, the city currently located in the district Paderborn II, which also has a strong CDU lean.

At local level, the city has always elected CDU mayors since 1946. Until 2009, the CDU held an absolute majority on the city council, and as late as 1979 received over 60% of the vote in the city.

Mayor
The current mayor of Paderborn is Michael Dreier of the Christian Democratic Union (CDU). The most recent mayoral election was held on 13 September 2020, and the results were as follows:

! colspan=2| Candidate
! Party
! Votes
! %
|-
| bgcolor=| 
| align=left| Michael Dreier
| align=left| Christian Democratic Union
| 29,038
| 52.0
|-
| bgcolor=| 
| align=left| Klaus Schröder
| align=left| Alliance 90/The Greens
| 11,194
| 20.1
|-
| bgcolor=| 
| align=left| Martin Pantke
| align=left| Social Democratic Party
| 6,902
| 12.4
|-
| bgcolor=| 
| align=left| Elke Süsselbeck
| align=left| The Left
| 2,467
| 4.4
|-
| bgcolor=| 
| align=left| Marvin Weber
| align=left| Alternative for Germany
| 2,404
| 4.3
|-
| bgcolor=| 
| align=left| Alexander Senn
| align=left| Free Democratic Party
| 1,743
| 3.1
|-
| 
| align=left| Stephan Hoppe
| align=left| For Paderborn
| 1,099
| 2.0
|-
| bgcolor=| 
| align=left| Verani Kartum
| align=left| Volt Germany
| 538
| 1.0
|-
| bgcolor=| 
| align=left| Hartmut Hüttemann
| align=left| Free Voters
| 416
| 0.8
|-
! colspan=3| Valid votes
! 55,801
! 99.2
|-
! colspan=3| Invalid votes
! 464
! 0.8
|-
! colspan=3| Total
! 56,265
! 100.0
|-
! colspan=3| Electorate/voter turnout
! 118,244
! 48.6
|-
| colspan=7| Source: City of Paderborn
|}

City council

The Paderborn city council governs the city alongside the Mayor. The most recent city council election was held on 13 September 2020, and the results were as follows:

! colspan=2| Party
! Votes
! %
! +/-
! Seats
! +/-
|-
| bgcolor=| 
| align=left| Christian Democratic Union (CDU)
| 22,412
| 40.3
|  6.1
| 24
|  6
|-
| bgcolor=| 
| align=left| Alliance 90/The Greens (Grüne)
| 13,412
| 24.1
|  9.6
| 14
|  5
|-
| bgcolor=| 
| align=left| Social Democratic Party (SPD)
| 7,101
| 12.8
|  9.5
| 7
|  7
|-
| bgcolor=| 
| align=left| Free Democratic Party (FDP)
| 3,152
| 2.7
|  1.1
| 3
| ±0
|-
| bgcolor=| 
| align=left| Alternative for Germany (AfD)
| 2,811
| 5.1
|  1.5
| 3
|  1
|-
| bgcolor=| 
| align=left| The Left (Die Linke)
| 2,554
| 4.6
|  0.0
| 3
| ±0
|-
| 
| align=left| For Paderborn (Für PB)
| 1,541
| 2.8
| New
| 2
| New
|-
| bgcolor=| 
| align=left| Die PARTEI
| 1,485
| 2.7
| New
| 2
| New
|-
| bgcolor=| 
| align=left| Free Citizens' Initiative – Free Voters (FBI)
| 564
| 1.0
|  1.9
| 1
|  1
|-
| bgcolor=| 
| align=left| Volt Germany (Volt)
| 536
| 1.0
| New
| 1
| New
|-
! colspan=2| Valid votes
! 55,568
! 98.9
! 
! 
! 
|-
! colspan=2| Invalid votes
! 604
! 1.1
! 
! 
! 
|-
! colspan=2| Total
! 56,172
! 100.0
! 
! 60
!  4
|-
! colspan=2| Electorate/voter turnout
! 118,244
! 47.5
!  1.1
! 
! 
|-
| colspan=7| Source: City of Paderborn
|}

Twin towns – sister cities

Paderborn is twinned with:
 Le Mans, France (officially since 1967, traditionally since 836, the oldest partnership of its kind)
 Bolton, England, United Kingdom (1975)
 Belleville, United States (1990)
 Pamplona, Spain (1992)
 Przemyśl, Poland (1993)
 Debrecen, Hungary (1994)
 Qingdao, China (2003)

Sports
Paderborn is nationally known as a center for American Sports. The local baseball team, the Paderborn Untouchables, has won many German championships. The local American Football team, the Paderborn Dolphins, has also enjoyed considerable success. In 2006 the Paderborn Baskets, the home basketball team of the city was promoted to the Bundesliga.

Paderborn Baskets (basketball)
In the past, the Paderborn Baskets played multiple seasons in the Basketball Bundesliga. They reached the playoffs in the 2008–09 season.

Rugby Club Paderborn e.V.(rugby)
Recently Rugby Club Paderborn e.V. have had a great run in Regionalliga NRW and are on the verge of being promoted to the next league.

SC Paderborn 07 (football)
SC Paderborn 07 is the most successful football club in Paderborn. They were promoted to the Bundesliga, Germany's top flight, in 2019 but relegated back to 2. Bundesliga at the end of the same season.

The club was formed out of the 1985 merger of FC Paderborn and TuS Schloß Neuhaus as TuS Paderborn-Neuhaus and took on its current, shorter name in 1997, the 07 remembering the link with SV 07 Neuhaus. The Neuhaus club was founded in 1907 as SV 07 Neuhaus which was joined by the local side TuS 1910 Sennelager to become TuS Schloss Neuhaus in 1970. The Neuhaus and Paderborn teams played as tier III sides for most of their histories, as has the unified club. Today Paderborn plays its home matches at the Benteler Arena. In 2015, SC Paderborn were promoted to the Bundesliga for the first time. After relegation in their first season, Paderborn returned to the Bundesliga in 2019 only to be relegated again. Currently (2022) they have achieved comfortable mid-table positions in 2. Bundesliga.

Infrastructure

Transport

Paderborn is located at the Autobahn A 33, which connects Paderborn to the Autobahn A 2 in the north and the Autobahn A 44 in the south.

The main station is a regular stop for the InterCity on the Hamm–Warburg line and several local trains.

The Paderborn Lippstadt Airport connects Paderborn to the bigger German airports and offers flights to many locations in Europe. There is a bus shuttle between the airport and the Paderborn main train station. General Aviation and gliders are based at Paderborn-Haxterberg  (site of the world gliding championships in 1981).

In Paderborn there is a bus system served by the PaderSprinter for local buses and the Bahnbus Hochstift for regional buses.

Education

Paderborn was once the oldest academic site in Westphalia. In 1614, the University of Paderborn was founded by the Jesuits but was closed in 1819. It was re-founded in 1972 as Universität-Gesamthochschule and transformed into a university in its own right in 2002. Today, it is attended by about 20,000 students.

There also are several theological and private academic institutes in Paderborn.

There are a number of grammar schools in the city, the most prominent of which are the Theodorianum and St. Michael Gymnasium, along with others such as the Goerdeler-Gymnasium. There are also a few British primary schools such as John Buchan School, which was located in Sennelager and mainly educated children of British military personnel and the garrison's employees until its closure in 2019.

Notable people

Heinrich Aldegrever (1502–1558?), painter and engraver.
Carl Ferdinand Fabritius (1637–1673), painter
Franz Anton Cramer (1776–1829), apothecary, supported the discovery of morphine
Sophie Schröder (1781–1868), singer and actress.
Friedrich Sertürner (1783–1841), pharmacist, first to isolate morphine from opium
Joseph Hermann Schmidt (1804–1852), physician, director, Charité Birth Department, Berlin
George Henry Backhaus (1811–1882), Catholic priest
Franz von Löher (1818–1892), politician, jurist and historian
Christoph Ernst Friedrich von Forcade de Biaix (1821–1891), owner of the estate, judge and member of the German Reichstag
Julius von Ficker (1826–1902), German-Austrian historian
Joseph F. Rigge (1842–1913), the first president of Marquette College (now Marquette University)
Aloys Loeher (1850–1904), American sculptor, exhibited at the 1893 Columbian Exposition
Karl von Plettenberg (1852–1938), Prussian officer and later General of Infantry during WW1
Clemens Baeumker (1853–1924), Catholic philosopher and philosophy historian
Augustus F. Fechteler (1857–1921), Rear Admiral of the United States Navy during World War I
Ella Bergmann-Michel (1895–1971), painter, photographer and documentary filmmaker
Gustav Simon (1900–1945), Nazi Gauleiter in the Moselland Gau from 1940 until 1944 and Chief of the Civil Administration in occupied Luxembourg, died here
Josef Wirmer (1901–1944), jurist and resistance fighter against National Socialism
Friedrich Wilhelm Christians (1922–2004), banker
Heinz Nixdorf (1925–1986), computer pioneer, entrepreneur and founder of Nixdorf Computer AG
Walter Salmen (1926–2013), musicologist
Werner Franke (1940–2022), professor of cell and molecular biology
Ulrich Vogt (born 1941), teacher and non-fiction author
Mechtild Rothe (born 1947), politician (SPD) and member of the European Parliament
Franz-Josef Bode (born 1951), bishop of the Roman Catholic Diocese of Osnabruck since 1995
Rüdiger Hoffmann (born 1964), cabaret artist and musician
Bernd Hüttemann (born 1970), Vice President of the European Movement International and Secretary General of the European Movement Germany
Stefan Gödde (born 1975), television presenter, radio presenter and reporter
Judith Rakers (born 1976), journalist and television supporter (ARD)
Carsten Linnemann (born 1977), economist and politician (CDU), member of the German Bundestag

Sport 
Klaus Ehl (born 1949), athlete (sprinter)
Andreas Fischer (born 1964), footballer
Hans-Günther Vosseler (born 1949), swimmer
Günter Kutowski (born 1965), footballer
Martin Driller (born 1970), footballer
Reiner Plaßhenrich (born 1976), football player and coach
Jasmin Duehring (born 1992), Canadian cyclist
Alexander Nübel (born 1996), footballer
Tolgay Ali Arslan (born 1990), footballer

See also
 Paderborn method for teaching languages
 Disappearance of Katrice Lee

References

Further reading

External links

  
 Paderborn region website —
 Ordinances of the "Fürstbistum Paderborn" online—
 Homepage of the annual RoboCup competition—
 University of Paderborn—
 Basketball: Paderborn Baskets—
 Introduction to the History of Paderborn—
 

 
Paderborn (district)
Members of the Hanseatic League